The French Laundry is a three-Michelin star French and Californian cuisine restaurant located in Yountville, California, in the Napa Valley. Sally Schmitt opened The French Laundry in 1978 and designed her menus around local, seasonal ingredients; she was a visionary chef and pioneer of California cuisine. Since 1994 the chef and owner of The French Laundry is Thomas Keller. The restaurant building dates from 1900 and was added to the  National Register of Historic Places in 1978.

History

The building was built as a saloon in the 1900s by a Scottish stonesman for Pierre Guillaume. In the 1920s, the building was owned by John Lande who used it as a French steam laundry, which is the origin of the restaurant's name.

In 1978, Sally Schmitt and her husband Don purchased the building and renovated it into a restaurant. They kept the name, the French Laundry, because locals still referred to the building as such. The French Laundry was one of the first restaurants to offer what would become known as California cuisine. The Schmitts ran the restaurant nonstop for seventeen years, before selling it to Thomas Keller in 1994.

In 1999, Keller published The French Laundry Cookbook, which he considers his definitive book on cuisine. That year it won three International Association of Culinary Professionals (IACP) awards for Cookbook of the Year, Julia Child "First Cookbook" Award, and Design Award.

In 2004, the restaurant installed a geothermal heating and air conditioning system.

In July 2014, the Napa Valley restaurant celebrated its 20th anniversary with a six-hour feast for friends, locals, and luminaries and temporarily closed for renovations before the end of the year.

In December 2014, while being temporarily closed for renovations, The French Laundry wine cellar was robbed of an estimated $500,000 of wine. Most of the wine was subsequently recovered.

On April 7, 2015, the restaurant reopened following demolition of a number of buildings on the site. During the remainder of the renovation project, the staff worked out of a temporary kitchen.

During the COVID-19 pandemic, The French Laundry closed and re-opened several times, and faced restrictions such as limited seating. In November 2020, Governor Gavin Newsom attended a private party at the restaurant, and was photographed not socially distancing, nor wearing a protective mask, despite guidelines issued by his administration ahead of an expected holiday COVID-19 surge. Newsom received widespread criticism as a result, and the incident attracted support for the recall effort against him, which nonetheless failed by a wide margin.

Cuisine

Every day, The French Laundry serves two different nine-course tasting menus, one the Chef's Tasting Menu and the other the Tasting of Vegetables, which is vegetarian. During the winter holiday season, Thanksgiving, Halloween, and other holidays, the restaurant may offer special dishes. Both menus are US$355 per person, including gratuity for the base meal, although not including additional supplements such as caviar and truffles.

The food is mainly French with contemporary American influences, for example specialties such as smoked salmon cornets, which were inspired by a trip to Baskin-Robbins.

Staff
Notable alumni of The French Laundry's kitchen staff have included Grant Achatz of Alinea, Eric Ziebold of Kinship and Métier, Corey Lee of Benu, Jonathan Benno of Lincoln Ristorante, René Redzepi of Noma in Copenhagen, Ron Siegel of The Dining Room at the Ritz Carlton, and Duff Goldman of Charm City Cakes. Previous Chef de Cuisine Timothy Hollingsworth won the Bocuse d'Or USA semi-finals in 2008, and represented the U.S. in the international finals in January 2009, placing sixth.

Other locations
In February 2004, Thomas Keller opened the East Coast version of his Yountville restaurant, which he named Per Se. The kitchens of both restaurants are connected via a real-time video feed on a television screen.

Thomas Keller opened a pop-up restaurant in the Silverado Resort & Spa during the renovation of The French Laundry. The restaurant, which serves American classics, is called Ad Lib. This is not the first pop-up restaurant that Keller has helmed, previously popping up at the Mandarin Oriental in Hong Kong and at Harrod's in London.

Awards and accolades
Since 2005, it has been the recipient of the AAA Five-Diamond Award.

Since 2006, it has been awarded three stars in the Michelin Guide to San Francisco. It received a favorable review in The New York Times and was called "the best restaurant in the world, period" in 2005 by Anthony Bourdain.

Since 2007, the restaurant has been the recipient of the Wine Spectator Grand Award.
 2012, Culinary Hall of Fame Induction
 2007, Wine Spectator, Grand Award
 2006, Michelin Guide, Three Stars

See also
 List of Michelin 3-star restaurants
 List of Michelin 3-star restaurants in the United States

References

External links 

 
 Archive of French Laundry Menus

1978 establishments in California
Commercial buildings on the National Register of Historic Places in California
Companies based in Napa County, California
French-American culture in California
French restaurants in California
James Beard Foundation Award winners
Michelin Guide starred restaurants in California
National Register of Historic Places in Napa County, California
Restaurants established in 1978
Restaurants in the San Francisco Bay Area
Restaurants on the National Register of Historic Places
Tourist attractions in Napa County, California
Yountville, California